For Faen! is the third album by the Norwegian thrash metal band Blood Tsunami, released on March 8, 2013 by Indie Recordings.

Track listing
 "Butcher of Rostov" – 04:11
 "Dogfed" – 01:32
 "The Rape of Nanking" – 01:58
 "In the Dungeon of the Rats" – 03:17
 "Metal Fang" – 03:20
 "The Brazen Bull" – 04:44
 "Grave Desecrator" – 03:34
 "Unholy Nights" – 02:45
 "B.T.K. – 01:38
 "Krokodil" – 04:06

Personnel
 Pete Evil – vocals, guitars
 Faust – drums
 Carl Janfalk – bass, backing vocals
 Dor Amazon – guitars, backing vocals

References

2013 albums